N. N. Rimzon (born 1957) is an Indian artist known primarily for his symbolic and enigmatic sculptures.
His metal, fiberglass and stone sculptures have won him international acclaim, though in recent years his drawings have gained recognition.

Career 
Rimzon studied sculpture at the College of Fine Arts, Thiruvananthapuram. He studied at Maharaja Sayajirao University of Baroda, where he was considered among the best of the upcoming generation of artists that stemmed from MSU alumni including Jyoti Bhatt and Bhupen Khakhar. In 1989 he earned his MA with distinction from the Royal College of Art, London.

N. N. Rimzon's work has been featured in solo and group exhibitions worldwide and can be found in the collections of The National Gallery of Modern Art in New Delhi and Mumbai, the Talwar Gallery in New York City and New Delhi, The Foundation for Indian Artists in Amsterdam, and the Art Gallery of New South Wales, Sydney.

Works 
Born in the Indian state of Kerala, Rimzon's artistic vocabulary finds root in symbols derived from the rural landscape of southern India: the village compound, the palm tree, the temple, the forest pathway and the handmade canoe. In Rimzon's drawings he develops the themes that are found in his sculpture. Charcoal and dry pastel is used with a simple grace of line to create an often eerie and evocative stillness. This pristine tranquility seems to be intruded upon by symbols such as the sword and the felled tree. A sense of tragedy or alienation underlies depictions of what might otherwise be thought to be rural idylls. Rimzon's later works seem as much concerned with ecological threats as with communal aggression.

As a young man Rimzon experienced the political upheaval that accompanied Indira Gandhi’s Emergency during the mid-1970s. This was one factor that moved him away from narrative painting to experimentation with conceptually motivated sculpture. Rimzon concentrated on themes that depicted humanity's entrapment and anguish in a hostile environment that was of man's own making. In The Inner Voice (1992), a sculpted nude figure, cast in fiberglass, is displayed with its back against the wall and surrounded by a semicircle of cast iron swords. In Speaking Stones (1998), a crouching nude figure uses its hands to both hold its head and shield its eyes. The figure is surrounded by naturally sharp stones, which rest on photographs depicting massacres, demolitions, and other acts of communal violence that have been part of India's more recent history.

His most recent show at Talwar Gallery in New Delhi, The Round Ocean and the Living Death, is a continuation of his career's effort to unite the beautiful traditions of India to the complexities of its modern life through an artistic language. The sculpture the show is named after depicts mother-goddess figure seated at the center of a circle representing a quiet power. Rimzon's work requires no prerequisites for engagement, but rather speaks to an older and deeper level of humanity.

Solo exhibitions

 2020 Talwar Gallery, The Round Ocean and the Living Death, New Delhi, India
 2016 Talwar Gallery, Forest of the Living Divine, New York, NY, US
 2007  Bodhi Art, Liminal Embodiment, Seven Oceans and the Unnumbered Stars, New York, NY, US
 2005 Kashi Art Gallery, N.N. Rimzon: Works on paper, Kochi, India
 1993  Gallery Foundation for Indian Artists, N.N. Rimzon, Amsterdam, Netherlands
 1991 Art Heritage Gallery, Recent Sculpture and Drawings, New Delhi, India

Selected group exhibitions
 2014 National Museum of Modern and Contemporary Art, Rewriting the Landscape: India and China, Seoul, South Korea
 2012 5th Beijing International Art Biennale, National Art Museum of China, Beijing, China
 2009 Talwar Gallery, Excerpts from Diary Pages, New York, NY, US
 2008 Museum of Contemporary Art, Santhal Family: Positions Around an Indian Sculpture, Antwerp, Belgium
 2007 National Gallery of Modern Art, Edge of Desire: Recent Art in India, Mumbai, India
 2006 Berkeley Art Museum & Pacific Film Archive, Edge of Desire: Recent Art in India, Berkeley, CA, US
 2005 House of World Cultures, The Artist Lives and Works in Baroda/Bombay/Calcutta/Mysore/Rotterdam/Trivandrum, Berlin, Germany
 2004 Art Gallery of Western Australia, Edge of Desire: Recent Art in India, Perth, Australia
 2003 House of World Cultures, subTerrain, Berlin Germany
 2002 Manchester Art Gallery, Art South Asia, Manchester, UK
 1998 The Japan Foundation Forum, Private Mythology, Tokyo, Japan

References

External links
The Asian Age, Nature and Femininity, July 2016.
Art India, Magic Under the Skies, April 2016.
Mint, The Modernist Sprawl, February 2016.
Online biography
N.N. Rimzon on ArtNet
Rimzon photos on Flickr
Rimzon website

1957 births
20th-century Indian sculptors
Living people
Maharaja Sayajirao University of Baroda alumni
Artists from Kerala
People from Ernakulam district
20th-century Indian painters
Indian male sculptors
Indian male painters
20th-century Indian male artists